H & J Smith Holdings Ltd, branded as H & J Smith and known colloquially as H&J's or Smith's is a company which operates in the lower South Island of New Zealand. The company primarily operates in department stores, specialty stores and franchises (some within the main department stores). The department stores are located in Invercargill, Gore and Queenstown. There were also department stores in Dunedin, Te Anau, and Balclutha between August 2020 and January 2021. Historically, H & J Smith operated a network of stores in the Nelson and Blenheim area, which closed around 2006. H & J Smith has been operating since 1900.

History

H & J Smith was established by brother and sister John Smith and Helen Hay Smith in 1900 as a drapery store in Invercargill and became a major retail company in New Zealand. The company has also maintained a presence on Dunedin's George Street for almost a 120 years.  

On 25 May 2020, it was reported that H & J Smith was considering closing its stores in Dunedin, Mosgiel, Balclutha, Te Anau, and Gore as well as the Armoury Store in Dunedin and Outdoor World in Queenstown as a result of the economic effects of the global COVID-19 pandemic in New Zealand. The Take Note store in Gore would relocate but H & J Smith's stores in Invercargill and Queenstown would remain open. A final decision will be made in early June with the downsizing expected to affect 175 jobs. Dunedin and Clutha Mayors Aaron Hawkins and Bryan Cadogan have urged the company to reconsider their closure plans.

In early June 2020, H&J Smith confirmed the closure of its Te Anau and Balclutha stores in late July while downsizing its Gore branch in late August 2020. The Outdoor World in Queenstown and Take Note Store will also be closed down. These closures will affect 60 employees. On 19 June, H&J Smith confirmed that it would be closing its Dunedin department store in January 2021 and the Armoury Store in the nearby Wall Street precinct.

Department stores operated by H & J Smith

H & J Smith Invercargill 

The Invercargill Department Store is the flagship store, with by far the most floor space (the store taking up the width of a city block) and largest offering.

Store departments include Cosmetics and Fine Fragrance, Ladies' Fashion, Men's Fashion, Lingerie, Accessories (including jewellery and watches), Footwear, Icebreaker, Paper Plus, Waxx surf shop, uproar streetware, and Armoury Fashion Boutique on the Ground Floor. The First Floor includes Furniture, KidsWorld (including Fashion, Nursery and Toys), Soft Furnishings, Home Linens, Giftware (including Kitchenware tableware and Home Decor), Function Room, Gift Registry, Mother's Room, Main Office and toilets. H & J's also sells School Uniforms and Luggage.

The store also includes a café restaurant branded as The Copper Kettle on the upper floor, and MOOCH Espresso Bar on the ground floor. The Invercargill store includes a Sky Bridge connecting the store to a paid car park building.

Store history 
The Invercargill store was the very first H&J Smith store, the original store was located at 125 Dee Street in Invercargill and moved to 48 Tay Street in 1908 after the original premises was considered too small. In 1923 the Invercargill store was once again relocated this time H&J Smith's purchased the Price & Bulleid Building on the corner of Tay and Kelvin street, H&J Smith Invercargill remains in this location today. Since then the building has been extended several times stretching out to Kelvin street, a clock tower was added to the Tay street corner of the building in 1940, this was replaced with a digital clock in 1970 and the building facades were upgraded in 1969.

A car parking building was constructed across the road from H&J Smith's on the Esk street side, in the 1970s and a sky bridge between the car park and H&J Smiths was built in the 1980s.

H&J Smiths purchased the adjoining building on Esk street in 1989, at the time this was most recently used by the Invercargill Licensing Trust as a liquor store and before this was home to Watts & Greive Ltd, a Morris car dealer. This building was used for H&J Smiths Mitre 10 franchise between 1990 and 2004, H&J Smith's Appliance Centre between 2006 and 2011 and after extensive renovations were made to this building in 2014 the building is now home to Outdoor H&J Smith.

During the 2000s the Invercargill store was subject to major renovations including the addition of twin escalators, where in the past there was only one escalator going in the up direction. A larger cosmetic department located in the centre of the Esk Street end of the store was added in 2003, as well as an extensive Fine Fragrance area.

Dressmaking fabrics were removed from the store in 2009. In 2011, the Invercargill Paper Plus franchise, which H & J Smith had purchased in 2010, was incorporated into the main Invercargill store, replacing a Take Note franchise. Postal services were removed at this time, however in 2019 postal services were reinstated after the Invercargill Post Shop closed down.

An Appliance Department existed up until 2011, the original location was on the second floor but the department moved to the building next door in 2006 after Mitre 10 moved to its current Mega Store location. The appliance department was branded as H & J's Appliance Centre and for a time was a Betta Electrical franchise.

H & J Smith Gore 
Originally a large department store offering most of the services in the Invercargill flagship store but on a smaller scale, today H & J Smith Gore is a small store that offers Ladies and Mens fashion clothing.

Store history 
H & J Smith opened their second store in Gore in 1905 with the original location being the Criterion Hotel building. H & J Smith Gore was relocated to a new building on the corner of Main street and Irk street in 1913 and H & J Smith Gore remained in this building for 107 years, until September 2020. The upstairs portion of the store once housed the Woman's Club and a dental surgery. In 1954 Queen Elizabeth visited Gore and dined at the Womens club located in the H & J Smith building.  The front of the building was extended in size in 1925 doubling the Main street frontage and the Irk street frontage increased in 1930. In 2000 the store frontage was increased further after the neighbouring Hallensteins store closed down, an entrance way was created between the H & J Smith store and the former Hallensteins store with this area becoming the menswear department. 
Upgrades to the Gore store took place over the years including the addition of a lift in 1971, and the opening of the Viking Restaurant in the 1970s. In the late 90s the Viking Restaurant was replaced with a new cafe The Junction Cafe located at the front of the store. The shop main entrance was relocated to the corner of the building.

In February 2019 the Gore store was consolidated to a single floor with the public toilets and Soft Furnishings the only parts remaining on the First Floor. The consolidation to a single floor saw the closure of the Junction Café in 2018. 

In early June 2020, H & J Smith confirmed that their Gore branch would be further downsizing with the original store closing and relocated into the former Hallensteins building next door that H & J Smiths had used as the menswear department.  The New Zealand Post services were moved across the road into the Paper Plus store. Part of the H & J Smith Gore store has now been tenanted by a local retailer called Interior Warehouse. 

Departments that were offered in the Gore store prior to downsizing included Ladieswear, Childrenswear, Mens/Boyswear, Lingerie, Giftware (including Kitchenware, tabletop and Home Decor), Accessories, Cosmetics including Elizabeth Arden, Revlon, L'Oreal and Fragrance, Toys/Nursery, Soft Furnishings and Home Linens. A New Zealand Post and KiwiBank franchise also operated inside the store.

H & J Smith Remarkables Park (Queenstown) 
The Remarkable Park store is located in the Remarkable Park shopping centre in Frankton. 
The store is the newest and most modern, but still features the traditional cream interior colour scheme of the other stores. The store offers limited Cosmetics and Fine Fragrance, Ladies Fashion, Men's Fashion, Kids' World, Lingerie, Accessories, Footwear, Luggage, Giftware, Home Linens, Bedding, and Furniture. A major rival for beauty is Unichem Wilkinson's Pharmacy in central Queenstown, which has many of the counters and fragrances H & J has in the flagship Invercargill store.

Store history 
H & J Smith Ltd has been operating in Queenstown since 1971 when H & J Smith purchased Queenstown Drapery store WH Wheatley, located on Ballarat street in Queenstown. In 2000 a new store was built in the Remarkables Park Town Centre shopping centre which in addition to H&J Smiths included retail space for an Outdoor store (originally known as Element) and Mitre 10. The Mitre 10 store was relocated to Shotover Park in 2015 as a Mitre 10 Mega store and this retail space is now occupied by Harvey Norman.

Franchises operated by H & J Smith

Mitre 10 MEGA Invercargill 
The Mitre 10 MEGA store in Invercargill is owned by H & J Smith. H & J Smith's Mitre 10 was first opened in 1988 next to the Invercargill department store. In 2004 H & J Smith indicated their intentions to upgrade the Invercargill store to a Mitre 10 MEGA store. The new store was built in the former Woolworths Supermarket which had only been operating in the Central Business District of Invercargill for 4 years. The Burger King restaurant next to the Woolworths Supermarket had to be demolished and rebuilt in another part of the car park to accommodate the Mitre 10 Mega store. The Mitre 10 Mega store was opened in March 2005.

Mitre 10 MEGA Queenstown 
H & J Smith also operate the Mitre 10 MEGA store in Shotover Park in Frankton. The original Mitre 10 store in Queenstown was opened in 1993 and was located on Gray street. The store moved to the Remarkable Park shopping centre in 2000. As early as 2003, H & J Smith revealed intentions to build a new Mitre 10 MEGA store in Frankton, and after several attempts to gain resource consent the MEGA store was finally opened in 2015.

Laser Electrical Invercargill 
Originally known as H&J Smith Electrical and located on Tay Street this electrical contracting business is now a Laser Electrical franchise located on  Bond Street. The company offers an appliance repair service as well as a household and business electrical service. In the past there was also a H&J Smith Electrical business in Queenstown but this has now closed down.

Other stores operated by H & J Smith

Armoury   
This is a ladies' fashion boutique in store located in Invercargill and Queenstown. The Invercargill store is located at the Esk street corner of the department store; this store was formerly called Lifestyle. In Queenstown the Armoury store is located in a small store in the Remarkable Park shopping centre.

An Armoury store also existed in Dunedin in the Wall Street Mall, this store was previously called French Floozie.  
In mid-June 2020, H & J Smith confirmed that it would be closing down its Dunedin Armoury store as a result of the economic effects of the COVID-19 pandemic in New Zealand. The Dunedin Armoury store closed the same day as the H & J Smith Dunedin store.

H & J's Outdoor 
A sporting goods store, originally known as Outdoor World in Invercargill and Element in Queenstown. The Outdoor Invercargill store is located on Esk Street Invercargill next door to the H & J Smith Invercargill department store with an entrance between the two stores. H & J's Outdoor sells a range of outdoor clothing, camping equipment, sports equipment, bikes including a bikes workshop, hunting and fishing gear and firearms. H & J's Outdoor operates the franchise for Gun City in Invercargill.

Store history 
Outdoor World opened in the former Thomson and Beattie drapery store at 27 Tay Street Invercargill in 1972, the original store was on 2 levels. In 2014 Outdoor World relocated to its current location on Esk Street and today the original Tay Street building is now used as a motorcycle museum called "Classic Motor Cycle Mecca." In Queenstown H & J Smith opened an Outdoor store opened in the early 2000s this store was originally known as Element and later rebranded as H & J's Outdoor. 

In early June 2020, H & J Smith confirmed that its Outdoor World branch in Queenstown would be closing down in August, resulting in the loss of ten jobs. The Outdoor store in Queenstown closed on 29 August 2020.

Past stores operated by H&J Smiths

Big Scotty's 
Big Scotty's was a furniture store operated on Clyde Street in Invercargill selling lounge, bedroom, dining and home entertainment furniture. In October 2010, it was announced that this store would be closing.

H & J's Carpet World 
H & J's Carpet World was a carpet store on Tay Street in Invercargill selling a large range of carpets, vinyls and mats. This store was taken over by Flooring Xtra.

H & J Smith Dunedin 

H & J Smith took over the longstanding Dunedin department store Arthur Barnett in 2015 and operated this store until January 2021. The history of the Dunedin store dates back to 1903 as Arthur Barnett's flagship store. The Dunedin Arthur Barnett store building was remodelled into Dunedin's Meridian Mall between 1995 and 1997 with Arthur Barnett the anchor tenant in the Meridian Mall. At its prime, Arthur Barnett operated 5 stores across Otago. By the time of purchase, it had declined to a store in Dunedin and an online store. The online store was reformatted into H&J's first foray into online retailing. Arthur Barnett was sold to H & J Smith in June 2015 and after a short period continuing under its original name, store was rebranded to align with H&J's other department stores.  At the time of the H&J Smith takeover a section of the store was sub-leased to ToyWorld Dunedin, this arrangement had been in place since 2010 when the local franchise holder relocated from a ToyWorld store on Dunedin's Vogel street to a section of Arthur Barnett. This agreement came to an end in 2018 and the ToyWorld store closed with the section replaced with H&J Smith's toy department.  Following the rebrand from Arthur Barnett to H&J Smith the cafe was rebranded as Mooch Cafe, the same as the Invercargill store.

The store, within Dunedin's Meridian Mall on the main shopping street of George St, was H & J Smith's second-largest department store after its Invercargill flagship. Departments included Cosmetics, Ladieswear, Menswear, Lingerie, Accessories, Childrenswear and Toys, School Uniforms, Casual Living, Home Linens, Furniture, as well as an in-store 'espresso bar' café. The cosmetics department offered H&J's largest selection of prestige beauty brands.

On 19 June 2020, H & J Smith confirmed that it would be closing down its Dunedin branch in January 2021. The Dunedin store closed on 30 January 2021.

H & J Smith Balclutha 

H & J Smith operated a department store on Clyde Street in Balclutha between 2001 and 2020, the store was taken over from Arthur Barnett in 2001. The Balclutha store was small in comparison with H & J's other department stores, and carried a limited offering, but was large compared to surrounding retailers in Balclutha. In the past the store was on 2 floors with a furniture and home appliance offering.
Prior to closure the store offered Ladies', Men's and Children's Apparel, footwear, Revlon cosmetics, Giftware (kitchen and tableware), Home Linens and kids toys. 

In early June 2020, H&J Smith confirmed that it would be closing its Balclutha branch in July 2020. The Balclutha stored closed on 1 August 2020.

H & J Smith Mosgiel 
H & J Smith Mosgiel was a small fashion boutique located on the main street of Mosgiel. This store offered Ladieswear and a dry cleaning service. The Mosgiel store was sold to Longbeach Holdings Ltd in 2021 and will reopen at the end of February 2021 as APT Collections.

H & J Smith Te Anau 

H & J Smith Te Anau was a department store located in the Te Anau town centre and operated in Te Anau for 33 years between 1987 and 2020. The history of this store dates back to 1963 when business partners Dirkje Veenstra and Christina Mooyman opened The Ace Store in Te Anau. H & J Smith purchased The Ace Store on 4 April 1987. The building at this time was extensively remodelled and included the addition of a Temperature/Clock display similar to the one in the Invercargill store. In the early days the store included H & Js Carpet World in a shed at the rear of the store, The Hide Shop (a souvenir shop) was part of the original store but integrated into the main store in 1997. 

The Te Anau store initially traded as a full department store including whiteware, furniture and gifts. At the time of closure the offering included the Apparel, Home Linen, Footwear departments offered in the other stores. The store was always on a single floor.
In early June 2020, H&J Smith confirmed that it would be closing its Te Anau branch in July 2020. The 
Te Anau store closed on 1 August 2020.

Gallery

References

External links 
 H & J Smith Website

Invercargill
Companies based in Invercargill
Retail companies of New Zealand
Department stores of New Zealand
Retail companies established in 1900
New Zealand companies established in 1900